Events from the year 1761 in Denmark.

Incumbents
 Monarch – Frederick V
 Prime minister – Johan Ludvig Holstein-Ledreborg

Events
 4 January – The Danish Arabia Expedition departs from Copenhagen.
 13 January – The Fire Insurance for All Danish Market Towns is instituted by law.

Undated
 Georg Christian Oeder begins the publication of Flora Danica
 Johan Jacob Bruun begins the publication of his Novus Atlas Daniæ

Births
 22 January  Georg Nikolaus von Nissen, diplomat and music historian (died 1826)
 Marie Cathrine Preisler, stage actress (died 1797)

Full date missing
 Edmund Bourke, diplomat (died 1821)

Deaths
 February 17 — Simon Carl Stanley, sculptor (born 1703)
 July 16 - Jacob Fortling, sculptor, architect and industrialist (born 1711)

References

 
1760s in Denmark
Denmark
Years of the 18th century in Denmark